Heinrich Tiefenbach (born 17 September 1944) is a German philologist who specialized in Germanic studies

Biography
Heinrich Tiefenbach was born in Orsoy, Germany on 17 September 1944. He received his Ph.D. at the University of Bonn in 1970, and completed his habilitation at the University of Münster in 1984. Until his retirement, Tiefenbach was Professor of German Philology at the Institute for Germanic Studies at the University of Regensburg.

Selected works
 Studien zu Wörtern volkssprachiger Herkunft in karolingischen Königsurkunden. Ein Beitrag zum Wortschatz der Diplome Lothars I. und Lothars II. Dissertation. Wilhelm Fink, München 1973.
 Xanten, Essen, Köln. Untersuchungen zur Nordgrenze des Althochdeutschen an niederrheinischen Personennamen des 9.-11. Jahrhunderts. Habilitationsschrift. Vandenhoeck & Ruprecht, Göttingen 1984.
 Altsächsisches Handwörterbuch = A concise old saxon dictionary. de Gruyter, Berlin/ New York 2010.

Sources
 Kürschners Deutscher Gelehrten-Kalender 2013. Bio- bibliographisches Verzeichnis deutschsprachiger Wissenschaftler der Gegenwart. 1. Teilband, 25. Ausgabe. De Gruyter, Berlin/ Boston 2013, . (Geistes- und Sozialwissenschaften)

1944 births
German philologists
Germanists
Germanic studies scholars
Linguists of Germanic languages
Living people
Academic staff of the University of Regensburg
University of Bonn alumni